Zuzuvadi is a Neighborhood in Hosur, Tamil Nadu, which is roughly 30 km south of Bengaluru & 320 km west of State Capital Chennai. It is on the Bengaluru-Chennai highway near Hosur. The town is developed mainly due to the city of Bengaluru.

Demographics 
According to the 2001 census, Zuzuvadi had a population of 6,338, of whom 3,489 were males and 2,489 females. Zuzuvadi had a sex ratio of 1,010. Zuzuvadi had a literacy rate of 86.85.

Notes 

Villages in Krishnagiri district